Konstantin Sidulov (born January 1, 1977) is a Russian former professional ice hockey defenceman.  He played in the Russian Superleague for Traktor Chelyabinsk and HC Mechel. He was drafted 118th overall in the 1997 NHL Entry Draft by the Montreal Canadiens.

External links

1976 births
Living people
Fredericton Canadiens players
HC Khimik Voskresensk players
HC Mechel players
HK Liepājas Metalurgs players
Miami Matadors players
Montreal Canadiens draft picks
Russian ice hockey defencemen
Quebec Citadelles players
Tallahassee Tiger Sharks players
Traktor Chelyabinsk players
Sportspeople from Chelyabinsk